The Regeneron Science Talent Search, known for its first 57 years as the Westinghouse Science Talent Search, and then as the Intel Science Talent Search (Intel STS) from 1998 through 2016, is a research-based science competition in the United States for high school seniors.  It has been referred to as "the nation's oldest and most prestigious"  science competition. In his speech at the dinner honoring the 1991 Winners, President George H. W. Bush called the competition the "Super Bowl of science."

History
The Society for Science began the competition in 1942 with Westinghouse Electric Corporation; for many years, the competition was known as the Westinghouse Science Talent Search. In 1998, Intel became the sponsor after it outbid several other companies. In May 2016, it was announced that Regeneron Pharmaceuticals would be the new title sponsor. Over the years, some 147,000 students have entered the competition. Over 22,000 have been named semifinalists and 2,920 have traveled to Washington, D.C., as contest finalists. Collectively, they have received millions of dollars in scholarships and gone on, in later years, to capture Nobel Prizes, Fields Medals, MacArthur Fellowships and numerous other accolades.

Thirteen alumni of the Science Talent Search went on to receive Nobel Prizes, two earned the Fields Medal, eleven have been awarded the National Medal of Science, twenty received MacArthur Fellowships; three have won the Albert Lasker Award for Basic Medical Research; seven have won a Breakthrough Prize; and many have been elected to the National Academy of Sciences and the National Academy of Engineering.

Competition
Entrants to the competition conduct original research—sometimes at home and sometimes by "working with leading research teams at universities, hospitals and private laboratories."  The selection process is highly competitive, and besides the research paper, letters of recommendation, essays, test scores, extracurricular activities, and high school transcripts may be factored in the selection of finalists and winners.

Each year, approximately 1,800 papers are submitted. The top 300 applicants are announced in mid-January and as of 2017 each semifinalist and their school receives $2,000 from the title sponsor. In late January, the 40 Finalists (the award winners) are informed. In March, the Finalists are flown to Washington, D.C. where they are interviewed for the top ten spots, which have awards up to $250,000. The judges have included Glenn T. Seaborg (Nobel Laureate with Edwin M. McMillan in Chemistry, 1951) and Joseph Hooton Taylor, Jr. (Nobel Laureate in Physics, 1993). All finalists receive awards of at least $25,000.

Demography
The Science Talent Search is open to high school seniors living in the United States. Since the beginning of the competition, a large number of winners have come from New York, representing nearly one-third of the finalists in the years that Westinghouse sponsored the competition. New York has continued to lead the states in finalists in more recent years, more closely followed by California, and with significant numbers of finalists from Maryland, Texas, Massachusetts, New Jersey, Florida, Virginia, and Illinois. 

Certain high schools have been particularly successful at placing semifinalists and finalists in the Science Talent Search. From the early years of the competition, two specialized high schools in New York City dominated the competition: Bronx High School of Science and Stuyvesant High School. In the 1980s and 1990s, other specialized STEM schools, including Virginia's Thomas Jefferson High School for Science and Technology and Maryland's Montgomery Blair High School, began to produce large numbers of finalists to rival the New York City schools. Other New York schools, including Ward Melville High School in East Setauket and Byram Hills High School in Armonk, have also had notable success in the competition.

List of prominent individuals who were past winners

See also 
International Science and Engineering Fair
Broadcom MASTERS

References

External links 
 STS online entry system
 STS historical background

Science competitions
Society for Science & the Public
Awards established in 1942
Science Talent Search
1942 establishments in the United States
Student awards